The 1995 Stanford Cardinal baseball team represented Stanford University in the 1995 NCAA Division I baseball season. The Cardinal played their home games at Sunken Diamond. The team was coached by Mark Marquess in his 19th year at Stanford.

The Cardinal won the Midwest I Regional to advanced to the College World Series, where they were defeated by the Tennessee Volunteers.

Roster

Schedule 

! style="" | Regular Season
|- valign="top" 

|- align="center" bgcolor="#ccffcc"
| 1 || January 28 ||  || Sunken Diamond • Stanford, California || 6–0 || 1–0 || –
|- align="center" bgcolor="#ccffcc"
| 2 || January 30 || Saint Mary's || Sunken Diamond • Stanford, California || 5–4 || 2–0 || –
|-

|- align="center" bgcolor="#ffcccc"
| 3 || February 3 || at Cal State Fullerton || Titan Field • Fullerton, California || 9–11 || 2–1 || –
|- align="center" bgcolor="#ccffcc"
| 4 || February 4 || at Cal State Fullerton || Titan Field • Fullerton, California || 11–10 || 3–1 || –
|- align="center" bgcolor="#ffcccc"
| 5 || February 5 || at Cal State Fullerton || Titan Field • Fullerton, California || 3–5 || 3–2 || –
|- align="center" bgcolor="#ccffcc"
| 6 || February 7 ||  || Sunken Diamond • Stanford, California || 7–4 || 4–2 || –
|- align="center" bgcolor="#ffcccc"
| 7 || February 10 ||  || Sunken Diamond • Stanford, California || 2–3 || 4–3 || –
|- align="center" bgcolor="#ffcccc"
| 8 || February 11 || Fresno State || Sunken Diamond • Stanford, California || 0–6 || 4–4 || –
|- align="center" bgcolor="#ccffcc"
| 9 || February 12 || Fresno State || Sunken Diamond • Stanford, California || 4–2 || 5–4 || –
|- align="center" bgcolor="#ccffcc"
| 10 || February 13 ||  || Sunken Diamond • Stanford, California || 7–0 || 6–4 || –
|- align="center" bgcolor="#ccffcc"
| 11 || February 16 || at  || Dobbins Stadium • Davis, California || 7–0 || 7–4 || –
|- align="center" bgcolor="#ffcccc"
| 12 || February 18 ||  || Sunken Diamond • Stanford, California || 0–4 || 7–5 || –
|- align="center" bgcolor="#ffcccc"
| 13 || February 19 || at Santa Clara || Stephen Schott Stadium • Santa Clara, California || 3–5 || 7–6 || –
|- align="center" bgcolor="#ccffcc"
| 14 || February 20 || Santa Clara || Sunken Diamond • Stanford, California || 2–1 || 8–6 || –
|- align="center" bgcolor="#ccffcc"
| 15 || February 21 || at  || Dante Benedetti Diamond at Max Ulrich Field • San Francisco, California || 15–4 || 9–6 || –
|- align="center" bgcolor="#ccffcc"
| 16 || February 24 || at  || Jackie Robinson Stadium • Los Angeles, California || 6–5 || 10–6 || 1–0
|- align="center" bgcolor="#ffcccc"
| 17 || February 25 || at UCLA || Jackie Robinson Stadium • Los Angeles, California || 6–8 || 10–7 || 1–1
|- align="center" bgcolor="#ccffcc"
| 18 || February 26 || at UCLA || Jackie Robinson Stadium • Los Angeles, California || 2–0 || 11–7 || 2–1
|- align="center" bgcolor="#ffcccc"
| 19 || February 28 || at  || Sunken Diamond • Stanford, California || 2–10 || 11–8 || 2–1
|-

|- align="center" bgcolor="#ccffcc"
| 20 || March 4 || at  || Evans Diamond • Berkeley, California || 7–0 || 12–8 || 3–1
|- align="center" bgcolor="#ffcccc"
| 21 || March 6 || California || Sunken Diamond • Stanford, California || 4–6 || 12–9 || 3–2
|- align="center" bgcolor="#ffcccc"
| 22 || March 7 ||  || Sunken Diamond • Stanford, California || 4–7 || 12–10 || 3–2
|- align="center" bgcolor="#ccffcc"
| 23 || March 12 || at Southern California || Dedeaux Field • Los Angeles, California || 5–4 || 13–10 || 4–2
|- align="center" bgcolor="#ffcccc"
| 24 || March 12 || at Southern California || Dedeaux Field • Los Angeles, California || 1–5 || 13–11 || 4–3
|- align="center" bgcolor="#ccffcc"
| 25 || March 13 || at Southern California || Dedeaux Field • Los Angeles, California || 9–1 || 14–11 || 5–3
|- align="center" bgcolor="#ffcccc"
| 26 || March 25 ||  || Sunken Diamond • Stanford, California || 5–8 || 14–12 || 5–4
|- align="center" bgcolor="#ccffcc"
| 27 || March 26 || Arizona State || Sunken Diamond • Stanford, California || 6–3 || 15–12 || 6–4
|- align="center" bgcolor="#ccffcc"
| 28 || March 27 || Arizona State || Sunken Diamond • Stanford, California || 9–6 || 16–12 || 7–4
|- align="center" bgcolor="#ccffcc"
| 29 || March 31 || at  || Jerry Kindall Field at Frank Sancet Stadium • Tucson, Arizona || 12–8 || 17–12 || 8–4
|-

|- align="center" bgcolor="#ccffcc"
| 30 || April 1 || at Arizona || Jerry Kindall Field at Frank Sancet Stadium • Tucson, Arizona || 8–5 || 18–12 || 9–4
|- align="center" bgcolor="#ccffcc"
| 31 || April 2 || at Arizona || Jerry Kindall Field at Frank Sancet Stadium • Tucson, Arizona || 18–3 || 19–12 || 10–4
|- align="center" bgcolor="#ffcccc"
| 32 || April 4 ||  || Sunken Diamond • Stanford, California || 4–9 || 19–13 || 10–4
|- align="center" bgcolor="#ffcccc"
| 33 || April 8 || UCLA || Sunken Diamond • Stanford, California || 1–9 || 19–14 || 10–5
|- align="center" bgcolor="#ccffcc"
| 34 || April 8 || UCLA || Sunken Diamond • Stanford, California || 7–4 || 20–14 || 11–5
|- align="center" bgcolor="#ccffcc"
| 35 || April 9 || UCLA || Sunken Diamond • Stanford, California || 16–3 || 21–14 || 12–5
|- align="center" bgcolor="#ccffcc"
| 36 || April 10 || at Nevada || William Peccole Park • Reno, Nevada || 25–6 || 22–14 || 12–5
|- align="center" bgcolor="#ffcccc"
| 37 || April 13 || Southern California || Sunken Diamond • Stanford, California || 5–7 || 22–15 || 12–6
|- align="center" bgcolor="#ffcccc"
| 38 || April 14 || Southern California || Sunken Diamond • Stanford, California || 4–6 || 22–16 || 12–7
|- align="center" bgcolor="#ffcccc"
| 39 || April 15 || Southern California || Sunken Diamond • Stanford, California || 8–9 || 22–17 || 12–8
|- align="center" bgcolor="#ffcccc"
| 40 || April 20 || California || Sunken Diamond • Stanford, California || 0–4 || 22–18 || 12–9
|- align="center" bgcolor="#ccffcc"
| 41 || April 21 || at California || Evans Diamond • Berkeley, California || 6–3 || 23–18 || 13–9
|- align="center" bgcolor="#ccffcc"
| 42 || April 22 || California || Sunken Diamond • Stanford, California || 7–0 || 24–18 || 14–9
|- align="center" bgcolor="#ccffcc"
| 43 || April 23 || at California || Evans Diamond • Berkeley, California || 16–8 || 25–18 || 15–9
|- align="center" bgcolor="#ffcccc"
| 44 || April 25 || at San Jose State || San Jose Municipal Stadium • San Jose, California || 3–6 || 25–19 || 15–9
|- align="center" bgcolor="#ccffcc"
| 45 || April 28 || Arizona || Sunken Diamond • Stanford, California || 7–1 || 26–19 || 16–9
|- align="center" bgcolor="#ffcccc"
| 46 || April 29 || Arizona || Sunken Diamond • Stanford, California || 6–8 || 26–20 || 16–10
|- align="center" bgcolor="#ccffcc"
| 47 || April 30 || Arizona || Sunken Diamond • Stanford, California || 4–3 || 27–20 || 17–10
|-

|- align="center" bgcolor="#ccffcc"
| 48 || May 2 || at Santa Clara || Stephen Schott Stadium • Santa Clara, California || 8–6 || 28–20 || 17–10
|- align="center" bgcolor="#ffcccc"
| 49 || May 8 || at Sacramento State || John Smith Field • Sacramento, California || 8–2 || 28–21 || 17–10
|- align="center" bgcolor="#ccffcc"
| 50 || May 9 || San Francisco || Sunken Diamond • Stanford, California || 8–1 || 29–21 || 17–10
|- align="center" bgcolor="#ccffcc"
| 51 || May 12 || at Arizona State || Packard Stadium • Tempe, Arizona || 8–4 || 30–21 || 18–10
|- align="center" bgcolor="#ccffcc"
| 52 || May 13 || at Arizona State || Packard Stadium • Tempe, Arizona || 11–3 || 31–21 || 19–10
|- align="center" bgcolor="#ccffcc"
| 53 || May 14 || at Arizona State || Packard Stadium • Tempe, Arizona || 10–7 || 32–21 || 20–10
|- align="center" bgcolor="#ccffcc"
| 54 || May 19 ||  || Sunken Diamond • Stanford, California || 6–3 || 33–21 || 20–10
|- align="center" bgcolor="#ccffcc"
| 55 || May 20 || UC Santa Barbara || Sunken Diamond • Stanford, California || 3–2 || 34–21 || 20–10
|- align="center" bgcolor="#ffcccc"
| 56 || May 21 || UC Santa Barbara || Sunken Diamond • Stanford, California || 6–8 || 34–22 || 20–10
|-

|-
|-
! style="" | Postseason
|- valign="top"

|- align="center" bgcolor="#ccffcc"
| 57 || May 27 || vs  || Eck Stadium • Wichita, Kansas || 10–3 || 35–22 || 20–10
|- align="center" bgcolor="#ccffcc"
| 58 || May 28 || vs  || Eck Stadium • Wichita, Kansas || 8–1 || 36–22 || 20–10
|- align="center" bgcolor="#ffcccc"
| 59 || May 28 || vs  || Eck Stadium • Wichita, Kansas || 1–3 || 36–23 || 20–10
|- align="center" bgcolor="#ccffcc"
| 60 || May 29 || Lamar || Eck Stadium • Wichita, Kansas || 16–9 || 37–23 || 20–10
|- align="center" bgcolor="#ccffcc"
| 61 || May 29 || Texas Tech || Eck Stadium • Wichita, Kansas || 3–2 || 38–23 || 20–10
|- align="center" bgcolor="#ccffcc"
| 62 || May 30 || Texas Tech || Eck Stadium • Wichita, Kansas || 6–5 || 39–23 || 20–10
|-

|- align="center" bgcolor="#ffcccc"
| 63 || June 3 || vs Cal State Fullerton || Johnny Rosenblatt Stadium • Omaha, Nebraska || 5–6 || 39–24 || 20–10
|- align="center" bgcolor="#ccffcc"
| 64 || June 5 || vs Clemson || Johnny Rosenblatt Stadium • Omaha, Nebraska || 8–3 || 40–24 || 20–10
|- align="center" bgcolor="#ffcccc"
| 65 || June 6 || vs  || Johnny Rosenblatt Stadium • Omaha, Nebraska || 2–6 || 40–25 || 20–10
|-

Awards and honors 
Cale Carter
 All-Pac-10 South Division

Steve Carver
 All-Pac-10 South Division

A. J. Hinch
 Pac-10 Conference Southern Division Player of the Year
 First Team All-American Baseball America
 First Team All-American Collegiate Baseball

Joe Kilburg
 Honorable Mention Freshman All-American Collegiate Baseball

Kyle Peterson
 Pac-10 Conference Southern Division Pitcher of the Year
 First Team All-American Baseball America
 Third Team All-American Collegiate Baseball
 First Team Freshman All-American Baseball America
 First Team Freshman All-American Collegiate Baseball
 Freshman of the Year Baseball America
 Freshman of the Year Collegiate Baseball

References 

Stanford Cardinal baseball seasons
Stanford Cardinal baseball
College World Series seasons
Stanford